Ringolds Balodis (born 1966) is a Latvian politician and member of the twelfth Saeima.

References

1966 births
Living people
Politicians from Riga
People's Party (Latvia) politicians
National Alliance (Latvia) politicians
Deputies of the 12th Saeima